This is a select list of Cornish dialect words in English—while some of these terms are obsolete others remain in use. Many Cornish dialect words have their origins in the Cornish language and others belong to the West Saxon group of dialects which includes West Country English: consequently words listed may not be exclusive to Cornwall.


A
 – *Abroad – 1. open:  2. in pieces: 
 – 1. spoilt, rotten 2. empty, cracked or broken; e.g. 
 – ugly (Zennor, in use after the year 1800, from Cornish language )
Agerever – pollack (Marazion, in use after the year 1800, from Cornish language hager euver, meaning 'ugly useless') 
Aglets – hawthorn berries
Agone – ago; as in 'a week agone' (mid and east Cornwall)
Ake – a groove made on the stone of a killick (Mousehole, in use after the year 1800, from Cornish language ak, meaning 'a slit', or 'a cleft') 
All-overish – slightly out of sorts, nervous
Allycumpooster - all right (Camborne, in use after the year 1800, from Cornish language oll yn kompoester, meaning 'all in order') 
Ancient - to describe someone who is a real character, "he's an ancient man".
Anker - a small barrel (mining term, ultimately from Medieval Latin anceria ["a small vat"] perhaps influenced by Cornish language keryn, meaning 'open barrel' or 'tub'. Compare Danish anker ["beer barrel, wine cask, anker"]) 
Ansome - lovely (from "handsome"); Me ansome ("my handsome") (familiar way to address a man)
Anvon - a hard stone on which large stones are broken (mining term, from Cornish language anwen, meaning 'anvil')) 
Areah, Arear, Aree faa - an exclamation of surprise (in use after the year 1800, from Cornish language revedh, meaning 'strange', 'astounding', or 'a wonder') 
Arish (also written [and alternatively pronounced]  arrish, ersh, aish, airish, errish, hayrish and herrish) - arable field (from Middle English *ersch, from Old English ersc [“a park, preserve; stubble-field”], perhaps influenced by Cornish language arys) 
Arish mow – a stack of sheaves (in use after the year 1800, from Cornish language arys) 
Are 'em – aren't they
Awn – a cove / haven
Aye? – I beg your pardon?; Yes? What was that?
Ayes (pronounced, 'ace') – yes (see also: "Ess", below). Perhaps from Old Norse ei ("forever") + Old English sī(e) ("may it be"), like "yes" (which is from Middle English yes, yis, which is from Old English ġēse, ġīse, ġȳse, *ġīese [“yes, of course, so be it”], equivalent to ġēa [“yes", "so”] + sī[e] [“may it be”]). Alternatively, a modification of "aye" based on "yes". Further, possibly a conflation of any (or all) of the previous, and "ess", which may represent a dialectal form of "yes".

B

Backalong – in former times
Backsyfore – the wrong side first (also found in Devon)
Bal – a mine  (in use after the year 1800, from Cornish language, related to palas, meaning 'to dig') 
Bal maiden – a woman working at a mine, at smashing ore &c.
Ball – a pest, used figuratively (in use after the year 1800, from Cornish language ball meaning 'a pest', or 'the plague') 
Bamfer – to worry, harass, or torment
Bamfoozle – deceive, confuse, especially by trickery
Bannal – the broom plant (in use after the year 1800, from Cornish language banal, short for banadhel, meaning 'broom') 
Barker – a whetstone
Bean – (see "vean")
Begrumpled – displeased, affronted
Belong – 1. live or work – "where do 'ee belong to" 2. denotes habit or custom – "she belong to go shopping Fridays"
Belving – load roaring/bellowing especially by a cow (similar to Bolving of stags on Exmoor)
Berrin – funeral (burying)
Better fit/better way – it would be better if...

Bettle – mallet
Betwattled – confused, bewildered
Big-pattern – a show-off, "big-pattern he is"
Big-sea – rough sea / swell
Bilders – cow parsley
Bimper – a peeping tom
Biskan – a finger-stall (in use after the year 1800, from Cornish language byskon, meaning 'thimble', or 'finger sheath') 
Bits – spinach-beet, green beet-leaves, Chard (in use after the year 1800, from Cornish language betys, meaning 'edible plants of the genus Beta') 
Black-Annie – a black backed gull
Bladder – blister (part of mid Cornwall and north east Cornwall)
Bleddy – local pronunciation of 'bloody' as an emphasising adjective (e.g. "dang the bleddy goat")
Blowed – surprised "well I'm blowed"
Bobber lip – bruised and swollen lip
Brake – thicket / rough woodland
Borbas – a rockling (Newlyn, Mousehole, in use after the year 1800, from Cornish language barvus, meaning 'bearded') 
Bothel – a blister (in use after the year 1800, from Cornish language bothel) 
Bothack – the bib, or pouting (Mousehole, in use after the year 1800, from Cornish language bothek, meaning 'bossed', or 'hunchback') 
Bothack – a hunchback (Mullion, in use after the year 1800, from Cornish language bothek) 
Boughten – bought (i.e. food from a shop rather than home-made)
Bowjy – a cattle-house (in use after the year 1800, from Cornish language bowji) 
Brae / brer – quite a lot
Brandis – trivet
Brave – much/many (often pronounced with v not sounded or almost as m. see Brae above.)
Breal – a mackerel (Newlyn, Mousehole, Porthleven, St Ives, in use after the year 1800, from Cornish language brithel) 
Brink – the gills of a fish (Mount's Bay, St Ives, in use after the year 1800, from Cornish language brenk) 
Brock – a badger from Cornish language
Browjans – small fragments (in use after the year 1800, from Cornish language brywsyon, or brywjyon, meaning 'crumbs', 'fragments') 
Browse – undergrowth
Browse – pulped bait (Mount's Bay, in use after the year 1800, from Cornish language bryws, meaning 'crumbled material', or bros, 'thick broth') 
Broze – a blaze, a great heat (in use after the year 1800, from Cornish language bros, meaning 'extremely hot') 
Brummal Mow – an arish mow of domed form (in use after the year 1800, from Cornish language bern moel, meaning 'bald stack') 
Bruyans, Brewions – crumbs, fragments (in use after the year 1800, from Cornish language brywyon) 
Bucca – an imp, hobgoblin, scarecrow (in use after the year 1800, from Cornish language bocka) 
Buddy – a cluster, a clump (in use after the year 1800, from Cornish language bodas, meaning 'bunched', or boden, meaning 'a bunch', or 'a grouping', related to the Breton bodad and boden) 
Buffon – a bruise (in use after the year 1800, from Cornish language bothenn, meaning 'a swelling') 
Buldering – threatening, thundery, sultry (of weather or the sky)
Bulgranack – the smooth blenny (in use after the year 1800, from Cornish language pol gronek, meaning 'pool toad') 
Bulorn – a snail (in use after the year 1800, from Cornish language, related to Breton bigorn, a sea snail, or to Irish ballan, a shell) 
Bully – large pebble  (from Cornish language bili, meaning 'pebbles')
Bulugen – an earthworm (Mousehole, in use after the year 1800, from Cornish language buthugan) 
Bun-fight – the wake after a funeral
Bunny (also written as "bunney" and "bonie") - a bunch of ore, an unusual concentration of ore (From Middle English bony, boni [“swelling, tumor”], from Old French bugne, buigne [“swelling, lump”], from Old Frankish *bungjo [“swelling, bump”], from Proto-Germanic *bungô, *bunkô [“lump, clump, heap, crowd”]. Usage perhaps influenced by Cornish language bennigys, meaning 'blessed') 
Burd – (second person singular) bud as in "buddy"
Burgam – a jocular term of reproach (Gwinear, in use after the year 1800, from Cornish language berrgamm, meaning 'crookshank') 
Burn – a load, as much turf, furze, etc., as one can carry; of hake or pollack, twenty-one fish. (in use after the year 1800, either from Cornish language bern, meaning 'a stack', 'a heap', or a variation of bourn ("limit")) 
Burrow – heap of (usually) mining related waste, but sometimes used simply to mean "pile"
Buster – someone full of fun and mischief. (Originally a variant of "burster", but later influenced (and reanalysed) separately by/as "bust" + -er. The combining form of the term has appeared from the early 20th century but been especially prolific since the 1940s, owing to its appearance as military slang).
Buzgut – a great eater or drinker ("buz" being derived from the Cornish for "food")
Buzza, Bussa – large salting pot or bread-bin, (still in use, from Cornish language boos seth, meaning 'food jar', or related to Breton boñs, a hogshead barrel)  also found in phrase "dafter than a buzza" very daft
B'y – boy, (second person singular) like sir

C
Cabby – sticky, dirty, muddy
Cabester, Cobesta – the part of a fishing tackle connecting the hook with the lead (Mousehole, in use after the year 1800, from Cornish language kabester, meaning 'a halter', 'noose' or 'loop') 
Cabobble – to mystify, puzzle or confuse
 Caboolen, Cabooly-stone – a holed stone, tied to a rope, and used to drive pilchards or mackerel back from the opening of a seine (Mount's Bay, in use after the year 1800, from Cornish language kabolen, meaning 'a stirrer', 'a mixer') 
 Cack – filth (in use after the year 1800, from Cornish language kawgh, meaning 'excrement') 
Caggle, Gaggle – to cover in filth (in use after the year 1800, from Cornish language kagla, meaning 'void excrement', 'spatter with filth) 
 Cakey – soft, feeble minded (from 'put in with the cakes and taken out with the buns' - half baked)
Cal – tungstate of iron (in use after the year 1800, from Cornish language kall) 
 Calamajeena, Calavajina – a thornback (St Ives, in use after the year 1800, from Cornish language karleyth vejiner, meaning 'buckle/hinge ray') 
 Calcar – the lesser weever (in use after the year 1800, from Cornish language kalkar) 
 Calken, Calican – the father-lasher (in use after the year 1800, from Cornish language kalken) 
 Callan – a hard layer on the face of a rock (St Just, in use after the year 1800, from Cornish language kales, meaning 'hard', or kall, 'tungstate of iron') 
 Cand, Cam – fluorspar (St Just, in use after the year 1800, from Cornish language kann, meaning 'brightness') 
 Canker – a harbour crab (in use after the year 1800, from Cornish language kanker, meaning 'a crab') 
 Cannikeeper – a spider crab (in use after the year 1800, from Cornish language kanker) 
 Canter – a frame for a fishing-line, originally a peg was used (Newlyn, Mousehole, Sennen, in use after the year 1800, from Cornish language kenter, meaning 'a nail') 
Captain – the manager of a mine or similar enterprise
 Care – the mountain ash, or rowan (in use after the year 1800, from Cornish language kerdhin) 
 Carn – a pile of rocks (used as a word and also as a place-name element, in use after the year 1800, from Cornish language karn)
 Carn tyer – quartz (in use after the year 1800, from Cornish language kannter, meaning 'bright whiteness', or kanndir, meaning 'bright white ground') 
 Carrack – a stone composed of quartz, schorl and hornblende (in use after the year 1800, from Cornish language karrek, meaning 'a rock') 
 Cassabully – winter cress (in use after the year 1800, from Cornish language kas beler, meaning 'nasty cress') 
 Casteeg – to flog (in use after the year 1800, from Cornish language kastiga)
 Catched – caught
 Catchpit – a place in the home where everything is dropped
 Cauch – a mess (in use after the year 1800, see cack)
 Caunse – paved way  (from Cornish language cons)
 Chacking – thirsty
 Chacks – cheeks
Chaffering – haggling over a bargain
 Chea chaunter, Cheechonter – stop your chatter! (in use after the year 1800, from Cornish language ti tewelder, meaning 'swear silence')
Cheel – child especially girl "a boy or a cheel"
Cheldern – children
 Chewidden Thursday – a miners' festival (in use after the year 1800, from Cornish language dy' Yow gwynn, with Late Cornish gwydn, meaning 'white Thursday')
Chill – lamp
Chilth – chilliness of the atmosphere
Chimley – chimney
Chirks – remnants of fire, embers; "chirk" burrows where used coal was found near mines (from Cornish language towargh, via Late Cornish chowark, meaning 'peat or turf for burning')
Chopper - someone from Redruth, usually how a Camborne native would describe someone from Redruth 
Chuggypig – woodlouse
Churchtown – the settlement where the parish church is located
Clacky – sticky and chewy food
Clidgy – sticky, muddy
Clim (up) – climb (everywhere except west of Camborne and Helston)

Clip – sharp in speaking, curt, having taken offence
Cloam – crockery, pottery, earthenware
Cloam oven – earthenware built-in oven
Clunk – swallow; clunker – windpipe
Coffen stile – a coffen (or coffin) stile is a type of stile consisting of rectangular bars of granite laid side by side with gaps between (usually to stop livestock from straying)

Condiddle, Kindiddle – to entice, take away clandestinely
Confloption – flurry or confusion)
Coose – to hunt or chase game out of woodland/covert, from the Cornish word for woodland 'koes'. I.e. a command given to encourage a hunting dog "coose him out then dog!".
Cornish diamonds – quartz
Corrosy – an old grudge handed down from father to son; an annoyance
Cousin Jack – a Cornish emigrant miner; "Cousin Jacks" is a nickname for the overseas Cornish, thought to derive from the practice of Cornishmen asking if job vacancies could be filled by their cousin named Jack in Cornwall.
Cramble – to walk with difficulty
Crease – children's truce term (west Cornwall) (from the Cornish word for "peace")
Crib – a mid-morning break for a snack (see below also)
Croust (or Crowst) – a mid-morning break for a snack (usually west Cornwall)  (from Cornish language croust)
Cummas 'zon – come on, hurry up
Cundard – a drain
Cuss – curse
Cutting of it up – speaking in a fake posh accent

D
Daft – silly
Dag – short hatchet or axe (miner's dag); also in phrase "Face like a dag"; sheep tailings
Dappered – dirty / covered in mud
Dashel – thistle
Denner – dinner, evening meal
Devoner – someone from Devon (used in a derogatory sense)

Didikoy – gypsy (mid and east Cornwall)
Didnus – Didn't we
Dilley – wheeled play trolley made from wood and pram wheels
Dishwasher – water-wagtail
Do – auxiliary verb – "the pasties mother do make" or even "that's what we d' do"
Dobeck – somebody stupid ("great dobeck")
Dram – swath
Drang – narrow passage or lane
Drash – thresh; "drasher" = thresher
Dreckley / Dreckly – at some point in the future; soon, but not immediately; like "mañana", but less urgent
Dreckzel –  threshold of a doorway
Dry (china clay) – a dry is where the sludge gets processed (e.g. Wenford Dries)
Dryth – drying power, "There's no dryth in the wind today"
Dummity – low light level, overcast
Durns – door frame
Dwam – a swoon, faint or sudden feeling of faintness

E
'e – contraction of "he" but used in place of "it"
Easy – slightly simple mentally
Ee – contraction of thee
Eeval – farmer's fork implement
Emmet – ant or more recently tourist (mildly derogatory); four-legged emmet (mid-Cornwall) - newt
Ellen – a slate that has fallen from a roof (St. Ives)
'er – she (East Cornwall)
Ess – yes (see also, "Ayes", above)
Ess coss – yes of course
Ewe (cat) – she cat (mid and west Cornwall)
Exactly – as in "'e edn exactly", meaning he is not right mentally

F

Fains – children's truce term (east Cornwall)
Fall – autumn, Fall (south of a line from Mount's Bay to Launceston)
Ferns – bracken "the hounds lost the fox in the ferns"
Figgy hobbin – lump of dough, cooked with a handful of raisins (raisins being "figs" and figs "broad raisins")
Fitty – proper, properly
Fizzogg – face (colloquial form of "physiognomy")
Flam-new – brand new  (from Cornish language flamm noweth)
Fly, Flies – hands of a dial or clock
Folks – people (mid and east Cornwall)
 Fossick – to search for something by rummaging, to prospect for minerals (in use after the year 1800, from Cornish language feusik, meaning 'lucky' or 'fortunate') 
Fradge – repair
Fuggan – pastry dinner-cake
Furze, furzy – gorse, covered with gorse, as in the local saying at Stratton "Stratton was a market town when Bude was just a furzy down", meaning Stratton was long established when Bude was just gorse-covered downland. (A similar saying is current at Saltash about Plymouth.)

G

Gad – a pick, especially a miner's pick; this kind of pick is a small pointed chisel used with a hammer, e.g. a hammer and gad
Gashly – terrible, dismal, hideous (a form of ghastly)
Gawky – stupid; from the Cornish language "gocki" (stupid)
Gazooly, Gazol – gazoolying / gazoling means "to be constantly uttering laments"
Geeking – gaping
Geddon – good show / well done (cf. get on!)
Girt licker – very large object, as in "That fish you caught is a girt licker"
Giss on! – don't talk rubbish!
Glance – bounce (describing a ball) (mid and east Cornwall)
Gook – bonnet
Gossan – (in mining) a term for the loose mixture of quartz, iron oxide and other minerals often found on the "back" of a lode; decomposed rock
Grammersow – woodlouse
Granfer – grandfather
Griglans – heather
Grisly, Grizzly – a grating used to catch and throw out large stones from the sluices (still in use in mining industry worldwide, from Cornish language grysla, meaning 'to grin', 'to show one's teeth')
 Grushans, Groushans – dregs, especially in bottom of tea cup
Guag, Gwag – emptiness, hollow space in a mine (in use after the year 1800, from Cornish language gwag, meaning 'empty')
Gug – a coastal feature/cave, esp. North Cornwall; e.g St Illickswell Gug
Gunnis – an underground excavation left where a lode has been worked out
 Gurgoe – warren
Gwidgee-gwee – a blister, often caused by a misdirected hammer blow

H

Haggel – hawthorn berries
Hav – summer (hair+v)
Havage, Haveage – race, lineage or family stock
Hawn – haven, harbour 
Heave – throw (mid Cornwall)
Hell-of-a-good – very good!
Hell-of-a-job – a difficult job!
Heller – troublesome child
Henting – raining hard ("ee's henting out there")
Hepping stock – mounting block
Hoggan – pastry cake
Hoggans – haws
 Holing – working, mining (from Cornish language hwel, meaning 'a mine working') used in phrase "holing in guag", meaning mining somewhere that has already been mined.
 Huer – a lookout on land assisting fishermen by shouted directions

J

Jacker – Cornish man, mainly used by non-Cornish to refer to Cornish, especially used around the dockyards
Jackteeth / Jawteeth – molars; "jackteeth" is used in the north east, "jawteeth" in the southeast and mid Cornwall, but "grinders" in the west.
Jamien – a hero, legend, honourable person
Janner – Devon man (Plymouth especially)
Janjansy – a two-faced person
Jowse – shake or rattle
Jowster – itinerant seller, e.g. "fish jowster"

K
Kewny – rancid
Kibbal – iron container used for ore and rock haulage
Kiddlywink – unlicensed beer shop
Kieve – wooden tub, mainly used in mineral processing
Killas – (in mining) metamorphic rock strata of sedimentary origin which were altered by heat from the intruded granites in Devon and Cornwall.
Knack-kneed – knock-kneed
Knockers – spirits that dwell underground

L
 
Lathered – drunk
Larrups – rags, shreds, bits
Launder – guttering, originally a trough in tin mining (from Cornish language londer)
Lawn – a field
Leaking wet – very wet
Learn – teach (from Cornish language desky which means both 'to learn' and 'to teach', similar to French apprendre)
Leary, Leery – hungry, empty, faint and exhausted from hunger
Lennock – limp, flabby; pliant, flexible; pendulous
Lewth – shelter, protection from the wind
Linhay – lean-to (of a building)
Long-spoon – term to mean a tight-fisted person, i.e. you'd need a long-spoon to share soup with them!
Longfellas – implements with long handles
Looby – warm, muggy, misty (of the weather)
Louster – to work hard
Lowance out – to set limits financially (from "allowance")

M
Made, Matey, Meh'd – mate
Maid – girl, girl-friend (see also Bal maiden; Wheal Maid)
Maund – large basket
Mazed – greatly bewildered, downright mad, angry
Meader – unknown; used in the 'Poldark' novels apparently of a weakling or runt of a litter
Merrymaid – mermaid
Milky-dashel – milk thistle
Mim – prim, demure; prudish
Minching – skiving "minching off school"
Mind – remember
Month – a particular month is referred to with "month" added to its name, e.g. May month
Mossil – mid morning snack (used by St Just miners), similar to croust/crib
Mowhay – barn, hay store, stackyard
Murrian, Muryan – (Cornish) ant or more recently a tourist (mainly west Cornwall) (cp. Emmet) (from Cornish language moryon)
Mutt – sulk

N

Nestle-bird, nestle-drish (East Cornwall) – the weakest pig of a litter
Nick – onomatopoeic, tap – as in "'e go nick nick" i.e. it keeps tapping
Nickety-knock – palpitations
Niff – a silent, sullen feeling of resentment; a quarrel
Nip  – narrow path or short steep rise
Noggle – to manage anything with difficulty, especially to walk with difficulty
Nought but – as in "nought but a child" (east Cornwall)

O

Oggy – pasty  (from Cornish language hogen)
Ope – an alley (between buildings)
Oss – horse

P

Padgypaw, Padgy-pow (West Cornwall) – a newt (from Cornish language pajar paw)
Palm – the pussy willow, branches of which were traditionally used as substitutes for the palm or olives branches on Palm Sunday
Pard – friend ("partner")
Party – a young woman
Parwhobble – a conference (as a noun); to talk continuously so as to dominate the conversation (as a verb)
Peeth – well (for supplying water)
Perjinkety – apt to take offence
Piffer – porpoise
Piggal – turf cutting tool
Piggy-whidden (West Cornwall) – the runt of a litter of pigs
Pig's-crow – pigsty
Pike – pitchfork
Pilez, Pillas – Avena nuda (formerly used as a substitute for oatmeal and for fattening calves)
Pilth – small balls found in over-rubbed cotton
Pindy or Peendy – tainted usually of foodstuffs going off or rancid, especially by sense of smell 'this meat is pindy'
Pisky – pixie
Planching/Planchen – a wooden or planked floor
Platt – market place (e.g. The Platt at Wadebridge, or The Townplatt at Port Isaac)
Pluffy – fat, swollen, chubby; soft, porous, spongy
Pokemon – clumsy.
Polrumptious – restive, rude, obstreperous, uproarious
Preedy – easily, creditably
Prong – fork (such as a hay fork, garden fork, &c.)
Proper – satisfactory; "proper job"; "Proper Job IPA" is a St Austell ale
Pussivanting – an ineffective bustle (also found in Devon)

Q
Quiddle – to make a fuss over trifles
Quignogs – ridiculous notions or conceits 
Quilkin – frog (from Cornish language qwilkyn)
Quillet – small plot of land (for cultivation)
Quob, Quobmire – a marshy spot, bog or quagmire

R
Rab – gravel
Randivoose – a noise or uproar
Redders – (adjective) feeling physically hot, either from the weather or from exertion
Right on – an informal way of saying goodbye, or response to greeting "Alright then?"
Roar – weep loudly
Ronkle – to fester, be inflamed
Rumped (up) – huddled up, usually from the cold; phrase "rumped up like a winnard"

S
Sandsow (pron. zanzow) – woodlouse
Scat – to hit or break "scat abroad = smashed up" (e.g. "mind and not scat abroad the cloam"); musical beat ('e's two scats behind); "bal scat" is a disused mine (from Cornish language scattra). Also financial ruin "he went scat/his business went scat".
Scaw – elder tree
Sclum, Sklum – to scratch as a cat, or like a cat
Scovy, Scawvey, Skovey – uneven in colour, blotched, streaky, mottled or smeary
Screech – to cry loudly
Scrink, Skrink – to wrinkle, screw up (e.g. of half-closed eyes)
Scroach – scorch
Scrowl – to grill over the fire on an iron plate (e.g. scrowled pilchards)
Shalligonaked – flimsy, light or scanty (of clothing)
Shippen – farm building for livestock. From Middle English schipne, Middle English schepne, schüpene, from Old English scypen (“cow-shed, stall, shippen”), from Proto-Germanic *skupīnō (“stall”), diminutive of *skup- (“shed, barn”). Related to shop.
Shram – chill (as in "shrammed as a winnard")
Slab – a Cornish range
Slawterpooch – a slovenly, ungainly person
Slock – to coax, entice or tempt, as in "slock 'un 'round"
Small coal / slack – coal dust; "slack" only in the far south west
Smeech – acrid smoke (also used as a verb 'to smeech'), and also used as the verb in west Cornwall for misty rain, as "its smeeching".
Smuts – soot
Some – very, extremely (as in "'e d' look some wisht", "'tis some hot today")
Sowpig – woodlouse
Spence – larder in house; "crowded = House full, spence full"

Splatt – patch of grass
Spriggan – spirit
Sproil – energy
Squall – to cry
Squallass, squallyass – crybaby
Stagged – muddy
Stank – to walk, also a word for a long walk as in "that was a fair old stank" (from Cornish language stankya)
Stargazy pie / starry gazy pie – a pilchard pie with the fish heads uppermost
Steen – stoneware pot
Steeved – frozen
Stinking – a very bad cold/flu, i.e. "I have a stinking cold"
Stog, Stug – to stick fast in mud
Strike up / strike sound – start singing, especially with traditional spontaneous a capella Cornish pub singing
Stripped up – dressed appropriately
Stroyl – couch grass  (from Cornish language stroylek 'messy')
Stuggy – broad and sturdy (of a person's build)
Suant – smooth, even or regular
Swale – to burn (moorland vegetation) to bring on new growth

T
Tacker – small child, toddler
Teal – to till, cultivate (e.g. 'tealing teddies'; according to folklore Good Friday is the best day in the year to do this)
Teasy – bad-tempered as in 'teasy as a fitcher' or a childhood tantrum may be explained as the child being 'tired and teasy' (from Cornish language tesek)
Teddy / tiddy – potato
Thirl – hungry
Tidden – tender (from "tidn" Cornish language painful)
Tight – drunk
Timdoodle – a stupid, silly fellow
To – at; e.g. ""over to Cury" (at [the parish] of Cury) Also "Where is it?" could be phrased as "Where's he/her/it to?" and "Where's that" as "Where's that to" (compare usage in the Bristolian dialect).
Tob – a piece of turf
Towan – sandhill or dune (from Cornish language tewyn)
Town Crow – a term used by Port Isaacers to describe Padstonians, (see also the counter-term Yarnigoat).
Towser – a piece of material worn by agricultural workers and tied around the waist to protect the front of trousers, often made from a hessian potato sack
Toze – distentangle, pull asunder
Trade – stuff of doubtful value: "that shop, 'e's full of old trade"
Tuppence-ha'penny – a bit of a simpleton / not the full shilling, i.e. "she's a bit Tuppence-Ha'penny"
Turmut – turnip; or commonly swede (a Cornish pasty is often made of "turmut, 'tates and mate" i.e. swede, potato and meat)
Tuss – a rude name for an obnoxious person.

U
Ummin – dirty, filthy. As in 'the bleddy floor is ummin'.
Un – him/her (used in place of "it" accusative)
Upcountry – a generalised geographical term meaning anywhere which is in England, except for Cornwall and the Isles of Scilly.  (Also, "up the line" or "upward")
Urts – whortleberries, bilberries
Us two / We two – As in 'there are just we two'; "Us two" is used only in north east Cornwall and "we two" in the rest of Cornwall.

V
Veer – sucking pig
Vellan – villain
Visgy – mattock
Vor – furrow, as in a planted field
Vug – rock cavity

W
Wab – the tongue; usually in "hold your wab!"
Want – a mole (rhymes with pant). Want hill – a mole hill
Wasson – what's going on?
We be – as in 'Oh yes, we be!'; used in most of mid and east Cornwall, whereas "we are" is used in the far west.
Wheal – often incorrectly attributed to meaning a mine, but actually means a place of work; the names of most Cornish mines are prefixed with Wheal, such as Wheal Jane and Wheal Butson.
Whidden – weakling (of a litter of pigs)
Whiffy – changeable)
Whimmy – full of whims, fanciful, changeable)
Whitneck – weasel
Wilky (Quilkin) – a frog (from Cornish language qwilkyn)
Winnard – redwing; see also Winnard's Perch
Withys – willow trees
Withy-garden – area of coppiced willows cultivated by fishermen for pot making
Wisht – hard-done-by, weak, faint, pale, sad; e.g. "You're looking wisht today" see Winnard above for the saying "as wisht as a winnard"
Wo / ho – stop (when calling horses) ("ho" between a line from Crantock to St Austell and a line from Hayle to the Helford River; "way" in the northeast)

Y
Yarnigoat – term used by Padstonians to describe Port Isaacers. Due to the exposure of Port Isaac to the weather, the fishermen often could not put to sea and would instead congregate on the Platt to converse / tell yarns (See also, Town Crow)
You / yo – as an emphatic end to a sentence, e.g. "Who's that, you?"; "Drag in the cheeld, you! and don't 'ee lev un go foorth till 'ee 's gone"

Z

 Zackley – exactly
 Zam-zoodled – half cooked or over cooked
 Zart – a sea urchin (in use after the year 1800, from Cornish language sort, meaning a sea urchin, or hedgehog) 
 Zawn – a fissure in a cliff (used as a word and also as a place-name element, in use after the year 1800, from Cornish language sawen, or saven, meaning a cleft or gully) These fissures are known to geologists as littoral chasms.
Zether – gannet
 Zew – to work alongside a lode, before breaking it down (in use after the year 1800, from Cornish language sewen,, meaning prosperous, successful) 
 Zuggans – the essence of anything (in use after the year 1800, from Cornish language sugen,, meaning juice, sap, syrup, essence)

See also

 Cornish dialect
 Cornish language
 Old Cornish units of measurement

References

Further reading
Dyer, Peter (2005) Tintagel: a portrait of a parish. [Cambridge]: Cambridge Books  (includes transcriptions of interviews with local dialect speakers)
Nance, R. Morton A Guide to Cornish Place-names; with a list of words contained in them; 3rd ed. [Truro]: Federation of Old Cornwall Societies, [1961]
North, David J. & Sharpe, Adam A Word-geography of Cornwall. Redruth: Institute of Cornish Studies, 1980 (includes word-maps of Cornish words)
Pool, P. A. S. (1969) An Introduction to Cornish Place Names. Penzance: the author
Tregenna, Sal Guy Vox; Launceston Then!
Weatherhill, Craig Cornish Place Names & Language. Wilmslow: Sigma Press 1995, 1998, & 2000 
--do.--Place Names in Cornwall & Scilly: Henwyn plasow yn Kernow ha Syllan. Launceston: Wessex, 2005 
--do.--Cornish Place Names & Language; completely revised edition. Wilmslow: Sigma Press, 2007 
--do.--A Concise Dictionary of Cornish Place-Names. Westport, Mayo: Evertype, 2009 

English Dialect words
Dialect words
Dialect words
Cornwall
Cornwall